ASV Codar (from ) is an Arabic typeface developed by  . It was designed as a simplified typeface, with one vowels as their own characters. ASV Codar was first released in two versions: a "pure" version with only 84 characters, and a "total" version with 23 additional characters.

History 
Ahmed Lakhdar Ghazal first filed for a patent for his project in France in 1954. He submitted his idea to the Academy of the Arabic Language in Cairo in 1958, but it was rejected. ASV Codar was first released in two versions: a "pure" version with only 84 characters, and a "total" version with 23 additional characters.

In 1958, when Lakhdar Ghazal's was serving as both general secretary of Morocco's National Commission for UNESCO and head of the Fundamental Education section of the Moroccan , ASV Codar gained the support of the Moroccan government, which employed it in its first national campaign against illiteracy.

In 1960, the Moroccan government created the Institute for Studies and Research on Arabization at Mohammed V University for the development and modernization of Arabic, with Lakhdar Ghazal as its director. In 1975, an agreement with Morocco's  and UNESCO provided funding for Lakhdar Ghazal's project.

References 

Arabic typefaces
Arabization